Greatest Hits is a compilation album of recordings by the band Blondie released by EMI/Capitol Records in 2002.

Overview 
Following the re-issue of the six original studio albums in 2001, this was the first Blondie "Best of" compilation to be digitally remastered, the first Blondie "Best of" to be officially sanctioned by the band for over 20 years, and also the first to include their comeback hit "Maria", a UK #1 in February 1999.

Compiled by Capitol's Kevin Flaherty and London-based music journalist Steve Pafford, who also wrote the album sleeve notes, Greatest Hits features all of the tracks from the band's very first hits compilation, 1981's The Best of Blondie, including all four long-deleted 'special mixes' by producer Mike Chapman. Author Pafford was in the early stages of working with Debbie Harry on a lavish illustrated coffee table book entitled BlondieStyle (the sequel to his acclaimed BowieStyle, published by Omnibus Press), though as of 2010 the project is still on hold.

The album charted at #38 on the UK's Top 75 Album Chart and charted for 31 weeks. In New Zealand the album reached #15 and charted for 8 weeks.

As of August 9, 2005 it has sold 85,000 copies in United States.

The album was accompanied by a DVD release, Greatest Video Hits, which included the original 1981 Best of Blondie video album. However, the songs "Call Me" and "Sunday Girl" were not listed on the cover. The 2002 version added the videos for "The Hardest Part" (1979), "Island of Lost Souls" (1982) and the uncensored version of "Maria" (1999).

Track listing

CD

DVD

Charts

CD

DVD

Certifications

References

Albums produced by Mike Chapman
Greatest Hits(Blondie)
Greatest Hits (Blondie)